Saidat Adegoke (born 24 September 1985 in Ilorin, Kwara State, Nigeria) is a Nigerian footballer.

Career 
Adegoke in summer 2007 began playing for Remo Queens from her native Nigeria, in the Italian Serie A for ACF Trento. After their first Serie A season for Trento in 16 games, she scored 3 times, she moved in August 2008 to A.C.F. Milan. In Milan she developed and by summer 2011, scored 19 goals in 52 games. At the beginning of the season 2011–12 she changed to FCF Como 2000.

International 
Since 2010 she is in the extended squad of the Nigeria women's national football team.

References

External links

 

1985 births
Living people
Women's association football forwards
Nigerian women's footballers
Nigeria women's international footballers
ACF Milan players
Nigerian expatriate women's footballers
Nigerian expatriate sportspeople in Italy
Expatriate women's footballers in Italy
Yoruba sportswomen
S.S.D. F.C. Como Women players
People from Ilorin